Karkamış Dam is one of the 21 dams of the Southeastern Anatolia Project of Turkey. It is on the Euphrates River.

References

External links

 Official GAP web site
 
 Southeast Anatolia Sustainable Human Development Program (GAP) 
 Current status of GAP as of June 2000 
Data sheet

Dams completed in 2000
Energy infrastructure completed in 2000
Dams in Gaziantep Province
Southeastern Anatolia Project
Hydroelectric power stations in Turkey
Run-of-the-river power stations
Dams in Şanlıurfa Province
2000 establishments in Turkey
Crossings of the Euphrates
Important Bird Areas of Turkey